Dana Butte is a  prominence, (named for geologist and volcanologist James Dwight Dana), adjacent the course of the Colorado River, in the Grand Canyon and sits on the south side of Granite Gorge.

The butte lies at the end of a higher elevation bright-red, very narrow Supai Group ridgeline, and the spire of Dana Butte sits on the cliff-former Redwall Limestone that creates not only massive cliffs, but platforms that support younger rock units above. Dana Butte's prominence spire is dull gray, sitting on gray debris on the platform, and is composed of weathered Supai Group Manakacha Formation, also a cliff-former rock. Dana Butte drains west into the Salt Creek (Grand Canyon) drainage, and east into the adjacent canyon of the terminus of Salt Creek.

See also
 Geology of the Grand Canyon area
 The Alligator (Grand Canyon)
 The Battleship (Grand Canyon)

References

Buttes of Arizona
Grand Canyon
Grand Canyon National Park
Landforms of Coconino County, Arizona
North American 1000 m summits